Lite FM was a New Zealand radio station broadcasting in Christchurch on 94.5FM. The station was first started in 1997 by Radio Otago in Dunedin on 90.2 FM, the programme was also networked to Invercargill on 98.0 FM. Programming on the station at this point was mostly voice tracked and on air the station was often called "The Lite FM Network." In 1998 Lite FM began broadcasting in Christchurch when Radio Otago rebranded Easy Listening i94 as Lite FM. Easy Listening i94 was first started in Christchurch in 1994 by C93FM Limited under a franchise agreement with Easy Listening i, Radio Otago purchased C93FM Limited in 1997.

In 1999 Radio Otago was sold to The RadioWorks and the Invercargill and Dunedin stations were replaced with network station Solid Gold. Lite FM continued to broadcast in Christchuch and became part of Radioworks collection of local stations known as LocalWorks.

The station played easy-listening music from the 1970s to present day.  The station was rebranded and replaced by The Breeze in 2004 when Radioworks decided to rebrand all their local Easy Listening stations as The Breeze. Today The Breeze in Christchurch remains a live and local station despite other The Breeze stations having their local shows replaced with Auckland-based network shows, However the night show now comes from Auckland.

Radio stations in Christchurch
Radio stations in Dunedin
Defunct radio stations in New Zealand
The Breeze (New Zealand radio station)